is a Japanese manga series written and illustrated by Katsutoshi Kawai. It was serialized in Shogakukan magazine Weekly Shōnen Sunday from August 1996 to January 2005, with its chapters collected in 30 tankōbon volumes. The manga spawned two anime television series adaptations, Monkey Turn and Monkey Turn V, which were both produced by OLM and aired on TV Tokyo in 2004, totalling 50 episodes.

Monkey Turn won the 45th Shogakukan Manga Award in the shōnen category in 2000.

Plot
The series follows Kenji Hatano, a young man who sets out to master the world of kyōtei (hydroplane racing). Over the course of the series he develops a serious rivalry with fellow racer Hiro Doguchi.

Characters

Initially a high school student who was dreaming of being a professional baseball player, Hatano quits after losing a match against another school. His coach, who sees talent in Hatano, then introduces him to the world of motorboat racing. Hatano promises to become the top racer in Japan within three years. He realizes this feat by mastering the "monkey turn," a high-speed cornering technique used in boat racing.

Hatano's principal rival. His style of racing is much reviled by other racers on the circuit.

Hatano's childhood friend and romantic interest. She is very supportive of Hatano and attends all of his races.

Media

Manga
Monkey Turn was written and illustrated by Katsutoshi Kawai. It was serialized in Shogakukan's Weekly Shōnen Sunday from August 21, 1996 to January 1, 2005. Shogakukan collected its chapters in thirteen tankōbon volumes, published from February 18, 1996 to February 18, 2005.

Anime
Monkey Turn was adapted into a 25-episode anime television series by OLM, Inc., which aired on TV Tokyo from January 10 to June 26, 2004. A second 25-episode season, titled Monkey Turn V, was broadcast from July 3 to December 18, 2004.

Reception
The manga series won the 45th Shogakukan Manga Award in the shōnen category in 2000.

References

External links
 Monkey Turn at ShoPro Entertainment
 Monkey Turn at VAP 
 

1996 manga
2004 anime television series debuts
Hydroplanes
Motorsports in anime and manga
OLM, Inc.
Shogakukan manga
Shōnen manga
TV Tokyo original programming
Winners of the Shogakukan Manga Award for shōnen manga